Mr. or Mister World may refer to:
 AAU Mr. World, a bodybuilding competition of the Amateur Athletic Union
 IFBB Mr. World, a bodybuilding competition of the International Federation of BodyBuilding & Fitness
 Mister World, a male beauty pageant sponsored by the Miss World Organization